Edward Anthony Wharton Gill (1859-1944) was an English Canadian author and Anglican priest.

Gill was born in Scraptoft, England in 1858, received his primary education at Loughborough Grammar School and later attended the University of London. He briefly taught at Market Drayton and in the Danish West Indies before emigrating to Canada in 1884. Gill went back to school at the University of Manitoba and was ordained an Anglican priest. He then returned to teaching and became a professor of theology at St. John's College, University of Manitoba. He authored two novels - Love in Manitoba (1911) and An Irishman's Luck (1914).  He also released a semi-autobiographical work entitled A Manitoba Chore Boy in 1912.

References

External links
 

1858 births
1944 deaths
Canadian Anglican priests
People educated at Loughborough Grammar School